The black-headed nightingale-thrush (Catharus mexicanus) is a species of bird in the family Turdidae. It is found in Costa Rica, Guatemala, Honduras, Mexico, Nicaragua, and Panama.

Its natural habitats are subtropical or tropical moist lowland forest and subtropical or tropical moist montane forest.

References

black-headed nightingale-thrush
Birds of Central America
Birds of Honduras
black-headed nightingale-thrush
black-headed nightingale-thrush
Taxonomy articles created by Polbot